Erin Margaret Bermingham (born  18 April 1988) is a New Zealand former cricketer who played as a right-arm leg break bowler. She appeared in 34 One Day Internationals and 31 Twenty20 Internationals for New Zealand between 2010 and 2017. She played domestic cricket for Canterbury, as well as spending one season with Kent, in which she was the third-highest wicket-taker in the 2014 Women's County Championship, with her side also winning the competition. She has also worked as a police officer.

References

External links
 
 

1988 births
Living people
Cricketers from Greymouth
New Zealand women cricketers
New Zealand women One Day International cricketers
New Zealand women Twenty20 International cricketers
Canterbury Magicians cricketers
Kent women cricketers
New Zealand police officers